Francis Goodwin may refer to:

 Francis Goodwin (architect) (1784–1835), English architect
 Francis Goodwin (MP) (1564–1634), English politician
 Francis Goodwin (cricketer) (1866–1931), English cricketer

See also
 Francis Godwin (1562–1633), an English historian, author, and bishop